Natalie Anne Merchant (born October 26, 1963) is an American alternative rock singer-songwriter. She joined the band 10,000 Maniacs in 1981 and was lead vocalist and primary lyricist for the group. She remained with the group for their first seven albums and left it to begin her solo career in 1993. She has since released seven studio albums as a solo artist.

Early life
Natalie Merchant was born October 26, 1963, in Jamestown, New York, the third of four children of Anthony and Anne Merchant. Her paternal grandfather, who played the accordion, mandolin and guitar, immigrated to the United States from Sicily; his surname was "Mercante" before it was Anglicized.

When Merchant was a child, her mother listened to music (primarily Petula Clark but also the Beatles, Al Green, Aretha Franklin) and encouraged her children to study music, but would not allow television after Natalie was 12. "I was taken to the symphony a lot because my mother loved classical music. But I was dragged to see Styx when I was 12. We had to drive 100 miles to Buffalo, New York. Someone threw up next to me and people were smoking pot. It was terrifying. I remember Styx had a white piano which rose out of the stage. It was awe-inspiring and inspirational." "She [her mother] had show tunes, she had the soundtrack from West Side Story and South Pacific. And then eventually... she'd always liked classical music and then she married a jazz musician, so that's the kind of music I was into. I never really had friends who sat around and listened to the stereo and said 'hey, listen to this one', so I'd never even heard of who Bob Dylan was until I was 18." Merchant says she did not have a television set between 1988 and 1989: "I grew up in a house where no one watched the news on television and no one read the paper. I've been discovering these things as I get older, and the news has affected me more than it ever has before."

Merchant started working in a health food store at 16. She considered a career in special education after taking part in a summer program for disabled children, but in 1981 she started singing for a band, Still Life, which became 10,000 Maniacs.

Career

10,000 Maniacs

Merchant was lead singer and primary lyricist for 10,000 Maniacs, joining in its infancy in 1981 while she was a student at Jamestown Community College. The group recorded their first album Human Conflict Number Five, and recorded a corresponding music video at the Hotel Franklin and at Group W Westinghouse studios in Jamestown, New York, in 1982. Merchant sang lead vocals, and later played the piano as well on seven studio albums with 10,000 Maniacs. In 1993 she announced that she was leaving the group, citing a lack of creative control over the music she wrote with the band. Her last recording with the band, a cover of Bruce Springsteen's and Patti Smith's "Because the Night" at the 10,000 Maniacs MTV Unplugged performance, reached #11 on the Hot 100 chart on February 18, 1994; becoming the band's highest-charting song in the U.S.

Tigerlily (1995)

After her split with 10,000 Maniacs, Merchant was so eager to begin writing her own material that she went home that very day and composed the song "I May Know the Word", which was originally meant to appear on the soundtrack to the Tom Hanks movie Philadelphia. The song was eventually cut from the soundtrack, but it would go on to appear on Merchant's debut solo album, Tigerlily, which was released on the Elektra label in 1995.
The third song on the album, "Beloved Wife", was featured as the first song in the trailer for the film Message in a Bottle.

Tigerlily was a critical and commercial success, spawning her first top-ten hit in the single "Carnival", and achieving top-40 success with subsequent singles "Wonder" and "Jealousy". The album would go on to sell over five million copies, and continues to be Merchant's most successful album to date. She did extensive touring for it and made numerous television appearances, including performances on Saturday Night Live, at the Rock and Roll Hall of Fame, and on late-night talk shows. The media's immediate and critical effect on culture and cultural icons was of particular interest to Merchant.  In "River", a song from Tigerlily, Merchant defends River Phoenix as she castigates the media for systematically dissecting the child actor after his death.

Ophelia (1998–1999)

Three years passed before Merchant released her second solo effort, Ophelia. While Tigerlily contained sparse instrumentation, the music on Ophelia had lusher arrangements. The reprise at the close of the album featured a symphonic arrangement composed and conducted by British composer Gavin Bryars with whom she would collaborate nine years later to put Shakespeare's sonnets to music. Merchant treated the recording of Ophelia as a series of workshops, where she would invite various musicians she had met over the years into her home studio to collaborate and record. While Ophelia is not a concept record in the traditional sense, the name of the album and the title track are a literary reference to Shakespeare's Ophelia.

The first single off the album was a happy and uncharacteristically simple song called "Kind and Generous", which received massive airplay on VH1 and which solidified Merchant's role as a bona fide solo artist. That summer, Sarah McLachlan invited Merchant to co-headline the year's biggest music festival with her, Lilith Fair. The exposure from the tour helped the album reach Platinum status in just under a year, with subsequent singles "Break Your Heart" and "Life Is Sweet" receiving moderate airplay on adult contemporary stations. No video was filmed for the latter, however, with a clip from Merchant's appearance on VH1 Storytellers being used instead. She would also go on to appear on PBS' Sessions at West 54th and VH1's Hard Rock Live before the year's end. In 1998, Merchant also recorded George Gershwin's "But Not for Me" for the Red Hot Organization's compilation album Red Hot + Rhapsody, a tribute to George Gershwin, which raised money for various charities devoted to increasing AIDS awareness and fighting the disease.

The Ophelia tour ended in 1999 with the final few shows being performed and recorded on Broadway. The performance would be released as the album Natalie Merchant: Live in Concert with a companion video of the same name. The performance was notable in that it featured numerous covers including songs by David Bowie, Neil Young, and Katell Keineg.

In 1998, Merchant collaborated on the making of the album Mermaid Avenue with Billy Bragg and Wilco, which set previously unreleased Guthrie lyrics to music by Bragg. She provided lead vocals for the song "Birds and Ships" and backing vocals for "Way Over Yonder in the Minor Key", and returned for the second volume of the album, 2000s Mermaid Avenue Vol. II, providing  vocals on the song "I Was Born".

American folk music tour (2000) and Motherland (2001)
In 2000, Merchant embarked on a folk tour in the United States with many shows being supported by alt-country band Wilco.

Merchant's next studio album on the Elektra label was Motherland, released in 2001. Motherland saw Merchant at her most experimental musically. Motherland achieved Gold on the Billboard charts after debuting at No. 30 on the Billboard 200 and No. 13 on the Top Internet Albums of 2001, respectively. Rolling Stone favored this album with  stars, and also noticed a difference in Merchant's voice, which was more deep and gritty like that of Sade than her previous albums. Singles that were released from Motherland were "Just Can't Last", "Build a Levee" and "Tell Yourself".

Merchant embarked on a year-and-a-half-long world tour to promote Motherland. The first leg of the tour started in Minneapolis, Minnesota on October 17, 2001, with performances across the United States, and heading to Europe with some special acoustic shows in Europe. Merchant also participated in the Rock am Ring Festival and Rock im Park in 2002. In the summer of 2002, she was paired with Chris Isaak and played at stadiums and arenas.

The House Carpenter's Daughter (2003)

After her contract with Elektra expired in August 2002, Merchant decided not to sign with them again, or any other major label. Her next studio album, The House Carpenter's Daughter, was released in September 2003 on her own label, Myth America Records. To date this has been the only release on Myth America.

Leave Your Sleep (2010)
In October 2009, the websites of Nonesuch Records and Natalie Merchant announced that she had signed with the label. Leave Your Sleep was released on April 13, 2010 and is a compilation of five years of inspiration from a "conversation" with her daughter over the "first 6 years of her life". The album debuted on the Billboard Top 200 at No. 17, Billboard Folk Albums at No. 1, Amazon.com at No.1, and iTunes, No. 3. The album was co-produced by Andres Levin.

Merchant contributed a cover of Buddy Holly's "Learning the Game" to the tribute album Listen to Me: Buddy Holly, released September 6, 2011.

Natalie Merchant (2014)
In February 2014, Merchant announced her eponymous album. The album consists of new works. It is her first collection of original material since 2001's Motherland. Natalie Merchant was released May 6, 2014, on Nonesuch Records and was named Album of the Week by The Daily Telegraph. The album debuted at #20 on Billboards Top 200 albums and #2 on Billboards Folk Albums charts for the week of May 24, 2014.  She toured from July 3, 2014, kicking off in Kingston, New York, concluding at the Pabst Theater in Milwaukee on July 25, 2014.

Paradise Is There: The New Tigerlily Recordings (2015)
In 2015, Merchant released an album of new recordings of the songs from her multi-platinum solo album. She enhanced many of the tracks with strings and stripped others bare. She says, "The distance this music traveled once it left my hands is humbling, and I am moved by how many lives it has touched along the way."

Butterfly (2017)
In 2017, Merchant released Butterfly, a collection of new songs and orchestral versions of previously recorded songs.

Keep Your Courage (2023)
On November 29, 2022, Merchant announced that she will release her eighth studio album, Keep Your Courage, on April 14, 2023 via Nonesuch Records. The album will be Merchant's first of new material since her 2014 eponymous album Natalie Merchant.

Personal life
Merchant met Michael Stipe of the band R.E.M. in 1983. The two became close friends and eventually had a romantic relationship. They credit each other as inspirations for some of their songwriting. In an interview with The Independent, Stipe said, "Natalie was really the reason my work became politicised in the late Eighties."

In 2003, Merchant married Daniel de la Calle and had a daughter named Lucia. In an interview in 2012, she indicated that she was divorced.

Merchant enjoys gardening and painting. Some of her paintings can be seen on her website. She has been a vegetarian since 1980, except for the duration of her pregnancy, when she temporarily resumed eating meat. In 1997, she said: 

She now teaches arts and crafts to underprivileged children in New York state.

Activism
In 2012, Merchant, along with actor and writer Mark Ruffalo, organized a concert to protest oil and gas fracking in New York state. A documentary, written and directed by Jon Bowermaster, was made of the event and titled Dear Governor Cuomo.  She directed a short 2013 documentary titled Shelter: A Concert Film to Benefit Victims of Domestic Violence, that shone light on a group of women living in the mid-Hudson region of New York State responding to the crisis of domestic violence in their community with compassion and creativity. It was inspired by an event for One Billion Rising, a global campaign calling for an end to violence against women, held on February 14, 2013. Merchant presented a screening of the film at the Old Dutch Church in Kingston, New York, on the day of One Billion Rising for Justice.

Merchant, an outspoken critic of then-President-elect Donald Trump, participated in an anti-Trump protest organized by Mark Ruffalo and Michael Moore, held outside Trump International Hotel and Tower in New York City on January 19, 2017. Merchant performed her single "Motherland". She concluded the event with a group sing-along of Woody Guthrie's "This Land Is Your Land". The event was covered by CNN and broadcast live.

Merchant is a member of the Canadian charity Artists Against Racism and has worked with them in the past on awareness campaigns.

Awards and nominations
{| class="wikitable sortable plainrowheaders" 
|-
! scope="col" | Award
! scope="col" | Year
! scope="col" | Nominee(s)
! scope="col" | Category
! scope="col" | Result
! scope="col" class="unsortable"| 
|-
! scope="row" rowspan=4|ASCAP Pop Music Awards
| rowspan=3|1997
| "Carnival"
| rowspan=4|Most Performed Songs
| 
| rowspan=3|
|-
| "Wonder"
| 
|-
| "Jealousy"
| 
|-
| 1999
| "Kind & Generous"
| 
| 
|-
! scope="row" rowspan=4|Pollstar Concert Industry Awards
| rowspan=3|1990
| rowspan=3|10,000 Maniacs
| Small Hall Tour of the Year
| 
| rowspan=3|
|-
| Surprise Hot Ticket Of The Year
| 
|-
| Next Major Arena Headliner 
| 
|-
| 1996
| Herself
| Small Hall Tour Of The Year
| 
|

Discography

With 10,000 Maniacs
 Human Conflict Number Five (EP) (1982)
 Secrets of the I Ching (1983)
 The Wishing Chair (1985)
 In My Tribe (1987)
 Blind Man's Zoo (1989)
 Hope Chest: The Fredonia Recordings 1982–1983 (1990)
 Our Time in Eden (1992)
 MTV Unplugged (1993)
 Campfire Songs: The Popular, Obscure and Unknown Recordings (2004)

Solo

 1995: Tigerlily
 1998: Ophelia
 2001: Motherland
 2003: The House Carpenter's Daughter
 2010: Leave Your Sleep
 2014: Natalie Merchant
 2015: Paradise Is There: The New Tigerlily Recordings
 2017: Butterfly
 2023: Keep Your Courage

Filmography

Films

Television

References

External links

 
 
 
 

 
1963 births
Living people
10,000 Maniacs members
American contraltos
American women singer-songwriters
American pop pianists
American women pop singers
American pop rock singers
American rock songwriters
American women rock singers
People from Jamestown, New York
Elektra Records artists
Nonesuch Records artists
American people of Italian descent
Singer-songwriters from New York (state)
American alternative rock musicians
American folk singers
Folk pianists
American rock pianists
People from Ridgefield, Connecticut
American folk rock musicians
Jamestown Community College alumni
20th-century American pianists
21st-century American women singers
20th-century American women pianists
21st-century American singers
Singer-songwriters from Connecticut